= Ulakhan Negein =

Populated place in Yakutia, Russia

Ulakhan Negein is a populated place in Yakutia, Russia.
